The following is a list of museums and art galleries in Tokyo.

See also
 List of museums in Japan

Resources

 Tokyo Tourism Information
 Travel Tokyo

 
Culture in Tokyo
Tokyo
Museums, Tokyo
Museums
Museums, Tokyo